The 2021–22 Middle Tennessee Blue Raiders men's basketball team represented Middle Tennessee State University during the 2021–22 NCAA Division I men's basketball season. The team is led by fourth-year head coach Nick McDevitt, and played their home games at Murphy Center in Murfreesboro, Tennessee as members of Conference USA (C-USA).

Previous season 
In a season limited due to the ongoing COVID-19 pandemic, the Blue Raiders finished the 2021–22 season 5–18, 3–13 in C-USA play to finish in sixth place in East Division. In the first round of the C-USA tournament, the Raiders advanced to the second round when FIU was forced to withdraw due to positive COVID-19 tests. In the second round, they lost to North Texas.

Offseason

Departures

Incoming transfers

2021 recruiting class

Roster

Schedule and results

|-
!colspan=9 style=|Non-conference regular season

|-
!colspan=9 style=|Conference USA regular season

|-
!colspan=9 style=| Conference USA tournament

|-
!colspan=9 style=|CBI

Source

See also
 2021–22 Middle Tennessee Blue Raiders women's basketball team

References

Middle Tennessee Blue Raiders men's basketball seasons
Middle Tennessee Blue Raiders
Middle Tennessee men's basketball
Middle Tennessee men's basketball
Middle Tennessee